Florian Lipowitz (born 21 September 2000) is a German racing cyclist racing for UCI WorldTeam .

Career
In 2021 Lipowitz was part of the team that  sent to the 2021 Adriatica Ionica Race. After finishing thirteenth in the second stage, 2:03 down on the winner, he held onto his position in the Overall to finish thirteenth Overall and fourth in the youth classification. On 27 July 2022 it was announced that Lipowitz would join UCI WorldTeam  as a Stagiaire from August to the end of 2022 before joining the team on a two-year contract.

Major results
Sources:
2021
 5th Overall Giro della Valle d'Aosta
 10th Overall Grand Prix Jeseníky
2022
 8th GP Capodarco

References

External links

2000 births
Living people
German male cyclists